James Alfred Freeman (13 July 1904 – 1966) was an English professional footballer. He was on the books of five clubs, but is only known to have made Football League appearances for Lincoln City, in 1927.

References

1904 births
1966 deaths
People from Ilkeston
Footballers from Derbyshire
English footballers
Association football wing halves
Ashfield United F.C. players
Blackpool F.C. players
Lincoln City F.C. players
Mansfield Town F.C. players
Frickley Athletic F.C. players
English Football League players
Date of death missing
Place of death missing